Andrea Sguazella was a 16th-century Italian painter of the Renaissance period, active mainly in Florence and France. He was a pupil of the painter Andrea del Sarto and stayed behind to paint in the court of Francis I of France.

References

16th-century Italian painters
Italian male painters
Italian Renaissance painters
Painters from Florence
Year of death unknown
Year of birth unknown